Karniewo  is a village in the administrative district of Gmina Regimin, within Ciechanów County, Masovian Voivodeship, in east-central Poland.

References

Information Service in Network

News, photos..

http://www.naszekarniewo.wa.pl

Villages in Ciechanów County